The Minister for iTaukei Affairs is the Cabinet Minister responsible for the preservation of Fijian culture and for the economic and social development of indigenous Fijians and the Ministry of iTaukei Affairs. Before 2013, the position was called Minister for Fijian Affairs.

Prior to 1999, the Minister for Fijian Affairs also presided over the Great Council of Chiefs, but after that the Great Council elected its own Chairman. The following individuals have held the office since the ministerial system was established in 1967, when Fiji was still a British colony. If the Minister was simultaneously the Prime Minister, this is indicated by an asterisk.

The current Minister is Ifereimi Vasu.

List of ministers

References

Cabinet of Fiji